TV6 (in ) is the sixth Algerian public national television channel, also called Youth channel (in ).It is part of the state-owned EPTV group, along with TV1, TV2, TV3, TV4, TV5, TV7, TV8 and TV9. It is an Arab language channel and directed to the youth population.

History
TV6 was launched on 26 March 2020 as a variety channel.
On 31 July 2021, It is changed to be a youth channel dedicated to youth entertainment shows.

References

External links
  
 

Arab mass media
Television stations in Algeria
Television channels and stations established in 2020